Portugal was represented by Eduardo Nascimento, with the song "O vento mudou", at the 1967 Eurovision Song Contest, which took place on 8 April in Vienna. "O vento mudou" was chosen as the Portuguese entry at the Grande Prémio TV da Canção Portuguesa on 25 February. Eduardo Nascimento was the first black male singer in the history of the Eurovision Song Contest. Rumours claimed that Portuguese prime minister Salazar had chosen this particular singer to show the rest of Europe that he was not racist.

Before Eurovision

Festival da Canção 1967
The Grande Prémio TV da Canção Portuguesa 1967 was held at the Tóbis studios in Lisbon, hosted by Isabel Wolmar and Henrique Mendes. For the first time, semi-finals where held, the first on 11 February at 22:25 UTC and the second on 18 February at 22:25 UTC. Each semi-final featured six competing entries from which three advanced to the final from each show. A total of twelve songs took part in the final. Armando Tavares Belo conducted all the songs. The results were determined by a distrital jury, composed by three members, each had 5 votes to be distributed among the songs it intended to award, making a total of 15 votes per district.

At Eurovision 
On the night of the final Nascimento performed 5th in the running order, following France and preceding Switzerland. At the close of the voting the song had received 3 points, coming 12th in the field of 17 competing countries. The orchestra during the Portuguese entry was conducted by Armando Tavares Belo.

Voting

References 

1967
Countries in the Eurovision Song Contest 1967
Eurovision